Ormiscaig is a remote crofting village on the north east shore of Loch Ewe in Achnasheen, Ross-shire, Scottish Highlands and is in the Scottish council area of Highland.

The village of Mellon Charles is less than one mile west along the coast road.

Populated places in Ross and Cromarty